Bogota: City of the Lost is an upcoming South Korean crime drama film directed by Kim Seong-je, starring Song Joong-ki, Lee Hee-joon and Kwon Hae-hyo. It tells the story of immigrants who start dangerous deals to survive in Bogota, the last land for the hopeless lives.

Synopsis 
In the 1990s, 19-year-old Guk-hee moves to Bogota with his family, wishing for a better life only to end up living from hand to mouth. Beginning at the bottom of the ladder, he goes through hell and high water and now dominates the black market of Bogota.

Cast 
 Song Joong-ki as Guk-hee
 Lee Hee-joon as Soo-yeong
 Kwon Hae-hyo as Park Byeong-jang
 Cho Hyun-chul

Production 
Filming began in January 2020, in Bogotá, Colombia, but in March, due to the COVID-19 pandemic, production was halted after completing about 40% of the filming. After that, the production team reorganized the entire production and resumed filming in Korea in June 2021.

On July 2, 2021, it was reported that the filming was temporary suspended after it was confirmed that Song Joong-ki had been in contact with a COVID-19 confirmed person from the outside. Actor tested negative but was self-isolated per protocol. On July 15, filming resumed after Song completed self-quarantine.

Filming concluded in October 2021.

References

External links
 
 
 

Upcoming films
South Korean crime drama films
Film productions suspended due to the COVID-19 pandemic
2020s Korean-language films
Films set in Colombia
Films set in the 1990s